Czarnowice  is a village in the administrative district of Gmina Gubin, within Krosno Odrzańskie County, Lubusz Voivodeship, in western Poland, close to the German border.

People 
 Conrad von Kleist (1839-1900), German politician

References

Czarnowice